Adande may refer to the following people:
Given name
Adande Thorne, Trinidadian-American YouTube personality

Surname
Alexandre Sènou Adandé, African ethnologist
Alexandre Sènou Adandé Ethnographic Museum in Benin
Alexis Adandé (born 1949), Beninese archaeologist 
J.A. Adande (born 1970), American sportswriter